Muthoni wa Kirima (born 1931) was a top-ranking female fighter in Kenya's liberation movement Mau Mau or Land Freedom Army in the 1950. She is the only woman said to have been bestowed the Mau Mau rank of field-marshal. She was one of the very few women to become active fighters in the liberation movement.

Early life 
Muthoni wa Kirima was born in 1931 in Kenya's central region. Muthoni’s journey as a revolutionary started when she was a girl, saving money to have Jomo Kenyatta travel abroad to bring freedom. Although her parents worked on a European farm, after her marriage to Gen Mutungi, she moved to a village reserve for Africans in Nyeri before joining the Mau Mau.

In her 20s, she first worked as a spy for Mau Mau fighters who had camped in the forest when war broke out in 1952.

She was one of the very few women to become active fighters in the liberation movement. Most other women only worked as carriers of information or supplies.

During the war, Muthoni was wounded on two occasions but never caught. While living in the forest, she suffered a bad miscarriage that left her unable to conceive.

She moved out of the forest after Kenya gained independence from Britain in 1963.

“Kenya is my only child,” she told the Daily Nation in an interview in 2012, a loaded statement bearing in mind that her marriage did not bear her any children.

Trading in ivory 
Field Marshal Muthoni got a licence to trade in ivory in 1966, saying she used to kill elephants for food and hide the ivory, and knew where they had buried tusks during their life in the forest.

Her permission to collect and sell “wild” ivory ended in 1976 when trade in ivory was banned.

Later life 
In 1990, she served as a nominated councilor in Nyeri County Council, central Kenya.

In 1998, President Daniel arap Moi awarded her a medal for distinguished service, and in 2014, President Uhuru Kenyatta awarded her the Head of State Commendation.

Currently, Muthoni wa Kirima lives in a Nyeri suburb.

References 

1931 births
Living people
Mau Mau Uprising